Tethystola inermis is a species of beetle in the family Cerambycidae. It was described by Galileo and Martins in 2001 and is known to be from Venezuela.

References

Apomecynini
Beetles described in 2001